Guindilia is a genus of flowering plants belonging to the family Sapindaceae.

Its native range is Chile to Northwestern Argentina.

Species:

Guindilia cristata 
Guindilia dissecta 
Guindilia trinervis

References

Sapindaceae
Sapindaceae genera